During the 2004–05 English football season, Brighton & Hove Albion F.C. competed in the Football League Championship, after promotion from the second division the previous season.

Season summary
Brighton finished 20th out of 24 clubs, narrowly avoiding the drop by a single point, but achieving their highest league position for 14 years.

Final league table

Results
Brighton & Hove Albion's score comes first

Legend

Championship

FA Cup

League Cup

First-team squad
Squad at end of season

Left club during season

References

Brighton & Hove Albion F.C. seasons
Brighton and Hove Albion F.C.